Giuseppe Della Valle (25 November 1899 – 26 November 1975) was an Italian football player who featured in the Italy national team as a striker. He represented Italy at the 1924 Summer Olympics, where he scored twice.

Honours
Bologna
 Italian Prima Divisione Northern League (2): 1924–25, 1928–29

References

External links
 

1899 births
1975 deaths
Italian footballers
Association football forwards
Italy international footballers
Bologna F.C. 1909 players
Footballers at the 1924 Summer Olympics
Olympic footballers of Italy
Footballers from Bologna